Kali the Little Vampire (Portuguese: Kali, o pequeno vampiro) is a 2012 animated short film directed by Regina Pessoa.

The film was the last in a trilogy of animated shorts by Pessoa about childhood, following A Noite (1999) and Tragic Story with Happy Ending (2005). Kali the Little Vampire features original music from The Young Gods, and was produced by Abi Feijó (Ciclope Filmes), Julie Roy and René Chénier (National Film Board of Canada),  Pascal Le Nôtre (Folimage) and Georges Schwizgebel and Claude Luyet (Studio GDS).

Plot 
Kali is a young vampire who suffers from not being able to live in the light. Living in the shadows and inspiring fear, he lives envious of other children who don’t even dream that he exists. One day, while once again watching young boys play beside the train tracks, he breaks from his isolation and discovers that because of who—and what—he is, he can make a difference in others’ lives.

Reception
Kali the Little Vampire has won more than twenty awards at international film festivals and received the Portuguese Academy of Cinema's top "Sophia" award. In June 2014, it was shown in Paris as part of Panorama of Golden Nights, a program organized by UNESCO featuring 48 short films from 25 countries judged to have international cultural heritage value.

List of awards

See also
Vampire film

References

External links

The Making of ''Kali the Little Vampire - A Talk with Regina Pessoa, National Film Board of Canada

2010s animated short films
2012 animated films
2012 films
National Film Board of Canada animated short films
French animated short films
Portuguese animated short films
Fictional Portuguese people
Fictional vampires
Swiss animated short films
Vampires in animated film
Films directed by Regina Pessoa
Folimage films
Films produced by Julie Roy
2010s French animated films